The Nepali Language Movement was a political movement in the Republic of India advocating the recognition of the Nepali language as an language with official status in India. On 20 August 1992, the Lok Sabha passed a motion to add the Nepali language to the Eighth Schedule to the Constitution of India. According to an estimate in 2017, in India there about 40 million Nepali-language speaking Indians.

Nepali Bhasa Manyata Diwas 
Annually, Indian Gorkhas celebrate Nepali Language Recognition Day (officially Nepali Bhasha Manyata Diwas) on 20 August. The day is celebrated by organizing parades, literary and cultural programmes throughout India in places with significant Nepali speaking population. The same day is also celebrated as the Meitei Language Day (aka Manipuri language day) as both Nepali and Meitei language (officially called Manipuri language) get the "official language" status at the same time.

Sister movements 
During the same time, there was Meitei language movement. Both the Nepali and Meitei language movements get their goals on the same day, with the declaration of Nepali language and Meitei language (officially termed as "Manipuri language") as the official languages of India.

Current movements 
There is also an ongoing movement to create a Nepali-speaking Gorkhaland state in India.

See also

 Gorkhaland Territorial Administration

References

Further reading 

 
 
 
 

Nepali language
Linguistic rights
Language conflict in India
History of literature in Nepal
Gorkhaland
Indian Gorkhas
Darjeeling
History of Sikkim